This page presents the results of the Men's and Women's Volleyball Tournament during the 2002 Central American and Caribbean Games, which was held from November 28 to December 8, 2002 in San Salvador, El Salvador.

Men's tournament

Final standings

Women's tournament

Competing nations

Squads

Preliminary round

Group A

 November 29

 December 1

 December 3

Group B

 November 29

 December 1

 December 3

Quarterfinals
 December 4

Classification match (7th/8th place)
 December 5

Final round

Semifinals
 December 5

Classification match (5th/6th place)
 December 6

Finals

Bronze-medal match
 December 6

Gold-medal match
 December 7

Final standings

Awards

 Most Valuable Player:

References

 Results

2002 Central American and Caribbean Games
Central American and Caribbean Games
2002
International volleyball competitions hosted by El Salvador